The 2011 CSIO Gijón was the 2011 edition of the Spanish official show jumping horse show, at Las Mestas Sports Complex in Gijón. It was held as CSIO 5*.

This edition of the CSIO Gijón was held between August 31 and September 5.

Nations Cup

The 2011 FEI Nations Cup of Spain was the fifth competition of the 2011 FEI Nations Cup Promotional League and was held on Saturday, September 1, 2014.

The competition was a show jumping competition with two rounds. The height of the fences were up to 1.60 meters. The best six teams of the eleven which participated were allowed to start in the second round. As participant in the Promotional League, Denmark was also allowed to participate in the second round.

The competition was endowed with €63,600.

Grey penalties points do not count for the team result.

Gijón Grand Prix
The Gijón Grand Prix, the Show jumping Grand Prix of the 2011 CSIO Gijón, was the major show jumping competition at this event. It was held on Monday 5 September 2011. The competition was a show jumping competition over two rounds, the height of the fences were up to 1.60 meters.

It was endowed with 125,000 €.

(Top 10 of 40 Competitors)

References

External links
Official website
All results of 2011 CSIO Gijón

CSIO Gijón
2011 in show jumping
2011 FEI Nations Cup